Béatrice Fresko-Rolfo (born 12 February 1969, Monaco) is a Monegasque politician. Since 2013, Fresko-Rolfo is a member of National Council of Monaco.

Career 
In 2008, Fresko-Rolfo was a candidate for the national elections from the party Rally & Issues (Rassemblement et Enjeux). Since 2010, she is a member of the executive board of Rally & Issues. Since 2013, Fresko-Rolfo was elected as a national councilor from the political group Horizon Monaco (HM).

In 2016, Fresko-Rolfo as a President of the Women and Family Commission at the National Council was a member of the Prize Committee for the Monte-Carlo “Woman of the Year” contest.

For the general elections in February 2018, Fresko-Rolfo was a leader of Horizon Monaco. Before the general elections of 2018, she announced her candidacy for the presidency in the National Council.

In November 2018, Fresko-Rolfo visited the Women Leaders Global Forum in Reykjavík, Iceland to share ideas and experiences for women participation in economic and political development of the countries.

Fresko-Rolfo is representative of Monaco in Parliamentary Assembly of the Council of Europe.

Personal life 
Fresko-Rolfo is married and has two children.

References 

1969 births
Monegasque women in politics
Living people
Members of the National Council (Monaco)
21st-century women politicians